The women's 7.5 km sprint competition of the Pyeongchang 2018 Olympics was held on 10 February 2018 at the Alpensia Biathlon Centre in Pyeongchang, South Korea.

Summary
The field included the defending champion Anastasiya Kuzmina (who also won gold in 2010), the 2014 bronze medalist Vita Semerenko, and the 2010 bronze medalist Marie Dorin Habert. None of them returned to the podium, although Dorin Habert finished in the 4th position.

Kuzmina had the best time in the first 2.5 km but missed twice in the prone shooting and was out of medal contention after that. After the shooting, Dorothea Wierer was leading, closely followed by several athletes, but she missed twice at the standing shooting and dropped out of contention as well. After the second shooting, Laura Dahlmeier was the only athlete in the leading group who had not missed any targets. She had a lead of 13 seconds over Veronika Vítková and Marte Olsbu, and more than 20 seconds over other athletes. However, Vítková and Olsbu were early starters, and Dahlmeier did not have difficulties preserving the lead and eventually finishing in first position. Olsbu, who started just before Vítková, and after the second shooting was behind her by 0.1 seconds, won over a second on the last stretch, which was sufficient for an eventual silver medal. Vítková remained in the bronze medal position. Lisa Vittozzi, Irene Cadurisch, and Paulína Fialková were all losing about 10 seconds to Vítková and Olsbu after the second shooting (and all started after them and after Dahlmeier), but ran slower than they did. Dorin Habert was losing 13 seconds to Vítková and ran faster, but came to the finish in fourth position, 8 seconds behind Olsbu.

In the victory ceremony, the medals were presented by Valeriy Borzov, member of the International Olympic Committee, accompanied by Anders Besseberg, president of the IBU.

Qualification

Schedule
All times are (UTC+9).

Results
The race was started at 20:15.

References

sprint